Blanche of Bourbon (1339–1361) was Queen of Castile as the wife of King Peter. She was one of the daughters of Peter I, Duke of Bourbon and Isabella of Valois.

Queen 

On 3 June 1353, aged 14,  she married in person at Valladolid, Spain,  King Peter of Castile. Previously, she had been married by proxy at Abbaye de Preuilly on 9 July 1352.  They married because Peter wanted an alliance with France. It is believed by historians that King Peter had married his lover, the Castilian noble Maria de Padilla before his marriage to Blanche, though he did deny this. There were many difficulties in getting the money promised as a dowry for Blanche.

Three days after their marriage, Peter abandoned Blanche for Maria de Padilla, with whom he later had four children.

Eventually Blanche was imprisoned in the castle of Arevalo. Blanche's cousin, John II of France, appealed to Pope Innocent VI to have Peter excommunicated for keeping Blanche imprisoned, but the Pope refused. Blanche and Peter had no children.

Death 
In 1361, Blanche was transferred to the town of Medina Sidonia, where she was kept distant from possible rescue by the forces from Aragon and France battling King Peter. The pope advocated for her release.

In 1361, after Peter had made peace with the King of Aragon, he returned to Seville and hoped to eliminate the last bastions of resistance to his rule. According to Pero López de Ayala, he then instructed Iñigo Ortiz de Estuñiga, who was charged with keeping his wife imprisoned in Medina Sidonia, to kill her. Ayala, who had later joined with a winning faction led by Henry II, states that to Peter's anger, Estuñiga declined because the act was treasonous and likely to cause further disorder in the country. The King demanded that she be handed over to Juan Pérez de Rebolledo of Jeréz, a crossbowman of the king, who carried out the execution. However, partisans over the years were to write divergent stories about these events, depending on whether you looked upon him as "the cruel" (el Cruel) or "the purveyor of justice" (el Justiciero). During the 19th century, while Spain was ruled by the Bourbon monarchy, her tomb was provided with the following inscription in Latin:

CHRISTO OPTIMO MAXIMO SACRUM. DIVA BLANCA HISPANIARUM REGINA, PATRE BORBONEO , EX INCLITA FRANCORUM REGUM PROSAPIA, MORIBUS ET CORPORE VENUSTISSIMA FUIT; SED PRAEVALENTE PELLICE OCCUBVIT IUSSU PETRI MARITI CRUDELIS ANNO SALUTIS MCCCLXI. AETATIS VERO SUAE XXV

Sacred to Christ the best and greatest. Blessed Blanche, Queen of Spain, of Bourbon father, from the renowned lineage of the Kings of France, was lovely in manners and body; but, his concubine being favored over her, she lay down here by order of her husband Peter the Cruel in the year of salvation 1361 at the age of 25.

However, whether Peter did have her assassinated is a controversial claim. Zuñiga who amended Ayala's chronicles notes that partisans of the king called it a natural death. Others question such events, since she did not die in Jeréz, but in Medina Sidonia as per contemporary accounts. Also different versions of Ayala's chronicles make a different statement that she was poisoned by herbs (le fuero dadas yerbas) This latter statement was also repeated by Juan de Mariana in his history

It is not surprising that the history of Peter was rewritten in later years. Male descendants of King Henry II, the bastard half-brother of King Peter, and his slayer, would end up marrying female descendants of Peter. Henry III, who was grandson of Henry II, would marry Catherine of Lancaster, the daughter of John of Gaunt, the Duke of Lancaster, and Constance of Castile, daughter of Peter. Thus subsequent descendants of the joined lines would try to ameliorate the iniquity of Peter chronicled by the faction of Henry II. Bourbon rulers had a stake in sanctifying the image of Blanche, a distant member of their ancestral lineage.

Ancestry

References 

 Hale, Edward Everett, and Susan Hale. The Story of Spain. Story of the nations. New York: G.P. Putnam's Sons, 1886. googlebooks.com Accessed November 16, 2007
 Jones, William H. Blanche de Bourbon, and other poems. London: Hookham and Sons, 1855.   googlebooks.com Accessed November 16, 2007

|-

|-

1339 births
1361 deaths
Castilian queen consorts
Leonese queen consorts
Galician queens consort
House of Bourbon (France)
14th-century Portuguese people
14th-century Portuguese women
14th-century French people
14th-century French women
14th-century Castilians
14th-century Spanish women
Assassinated royalty
Murdered royalty